"Center of It" is a song by Christian Contemporary-R&B musician Chris August from his second album, The Upside of Down. It was released on June 12, 2012 by Fervent Records. The composers of the song are August and Ben Glover.

Background 
The song was written by Chris August and Ben Glover.

Release 
"Center of It" was digitally released as the lead single from The Upside of Down on June 12, 2012 by Fervent Records.

Charts

References 

2012 singles
2012 songs
Songs written by Ben Glover